Jillian Need  (11 March 1944 – 8 March 1997) was an associate professor of gynaecology and obstetrics and Australian and a South Australian cricketer.

In sport, Need was involved as a South Australian representative from 1965 until 1979, and in 1980 coached South Australia to its first senior national championships since the 1950s. She represented South Australia 13 times and led her state against England (68/69) and NZ (72) and played two tests against England in 68/69.

The Jill Need Breast Cancer Clinic was named in her honour by the Flinders Medical Centre in Bedford Park, South Australia, after her death.

References

1944 births
1997 deaths
Australia women Test cricketers
Australian gynaecologists
Sportswomen from South Australia
Australian women medical doctors
Australian medical doctors
Cricketers from Adelaide
Australian expatriate sportspeople in England